Matthias Herget (born 14 November 1955) is a German former professional footballer who played as a sweeper.

He amassed Bundesliga totals of 237 games and 26 goals over the course of eight seasons, mainly in representation of Bayer Uerdingen, of which he was also a longtime captain.

Herget gained 39 caps for West Germany, representing the nation in one World Cup and one European Championship.

Club career
Born in Annaberg-Buchholz, East Germany, Herget started playing professionally with VfL Bochum, appearing in two Bundesliga seasons. In the 1978 summer, he moved to the second division and joined Rot-Weiss Essen, appearing almost exclusively as a midfielder during his spell, and scoring 36 league goals in his last three seasons combined.

Herget continued in the second level in the 1982–83 season, netting five goals in 35 games for Bayer 05 Uerdingen as the team promoted to the top flight after finishing third. He continued to be an undisputed starter in the following years, also managing to score in every season during his seven-year stint, which included a best-ever third position for the club in 1985–86; additionally, he played the full 90 minutes in the final of the 1985 German Cup, winning the first and only trophy of his career after defeating FC Bayern Munich 2–1.

After having helped the Krefeld outfit once again retain its division status in 1988–89, 33-year-old Herget signed with FC Schalke 04, retiring at the end of the season. After becoming a manager, he was in charge of several lowly clubs, including SSV Buer, Eisbachtaler Sportfreunde 1919 e. V. and 1. FC Bocholt.

International career
Herget made his debut for West Germany on 26 October 1983, replacing Hans-Peter Briegel for the last ten minutes of a 5–1 home win against Turkey for the UEFA Euro 1984 qualifiers. He was part of the squad that finished second at the 1986 FIFA World Cup in Mexico, but only appeared once, in the 2–0 group stage loss against Denmark at Estadio Corregidora in Querétaro.

Still under manager Franz Beckenbauer, Herget became first-choice, also being selected for Euro 1988, which was played on home soil. He paired 1. FC Köln's Jürgen Kohler during the tournament as the national team reached the semifinals, and eventually gained a total of 39 caps.

Career statistics
Scores and results list West Germany's goal tally first, score column indicates score after each Herget goal.

Honours
Bayer Uerdingen
DFB-Pokal: 1984–85

References

External links

Matthias Herget at kicker.de 

1955 births
Living people
People from Annaberg-Buchholz
German footballers
Association football defenders
Bundesliga players
2. Bundesliga players
VfL Bochum players
Rot-Weiss Essen players
KFC Uerdingen 05 players
FC Schalke 04 players
Germany international footballers
Germany under-21 international footballers
1986 FIFA World Cup players
UEFA Euro 1988 players
German football managers
1. FC Bocholt managers
Footballers from Saxony
West German footballers
Footballers from North Rhine-Westphalia